In mathematics, the Levi-Civita field, named after Tullio Levi-Civita, is a non-Archimedean ordered field; i.e., a system of numbers containing infinite and infinitesimal quantities. Each member  can be constructed as a formal series of the form

 

The ordering is defined according to the dictionary ordering of the list of coefficients, which is equivalent to the assumption that  is an infinitesimal.

The real numbers are embedded in this field as series in which all of the coefficients vanish except .

Examples
  differs infinitesimally from 1.
  is greater than any real number.
  is a valid member of the field, because the series is to be construed formally, without any consideration of convergence.

Definition of the field operations and positive cone

 their sum  is the pointwise sum .
 their product  is the Cauchy product .
(One can check that the support of this series is left-finite and that for each of its elements , the set  is finite, so the product is well defined.)

Equipped with those operations and order, the Levi-Civita field is indeed an ordered field extension of  where the series  is a positive infinitesimal.

Properties and applications
The Levi-Civita field is real-closed, meaning that it can be algebraically closed by adjoining an imaginary unit (i), or by letting the coefficients be complex. It is rich enough to allow a significant amount of analysis to be done, but its elements can still be represented on a computer in the same sense that real numbers can be represented using floating point. 
It is the basis of automatic differentiation, a way to perform differentiation in cases that are intractable by symbolic differentiation or finite-difference methods.

The Levi-Civita field is also Cauchy complete, meaning that relativizing the  definitions of Cauchy sequence and convergent sequence to sequences of Levi-Civita series, each Cauchy sequence in the field converges. Equivalently, it has no proper dense ordered field extension.

As an ordered field, it has a natural valuation given by the rational exponent corresponding to the first non zero coefficient of a Levi-Civita series. The resulting valued field is Henselian (being real closed with a convex valuation ring) but not spherically complete.

Relations to other ordered fields

The Levi-Civita field is the Cauchy-completion of the field  of Puiseux series over the field of real numbers, that is, it is a dense extension of  without proper dense extension. Here is a list of some of its notable proper subfields and its proper ordered field extensions:

Notable subfields
 The field  of real numbers.
 The field  of fractions of real polynomials with infinitesimal positive indeterminate .

Notable extensions
 The field  of Hahn series with real coefficients and rational exponents.
 The field  of logarithmic-exponential transseries.
 The field  of surreal numbers with birthdate below the first -number .

References

External links 
 A web-based calculator for Levi-Civita numbers

Field (mathematics)
Infinity